Herbert Joseph Davenport (August 10, 1861 – June 15, 1931) was an American economist and critic of the Austrian School, educator and author.

Biography 
Born in Vermont, Davenport studied at the University of Chicago for a year or so under Thorstein Veblen, with whom he formed a lifelong friendship. His studies were apparently motivated, like many other revolutionary political economists of his time, by a desire to find the flaws in socialism.

Following his degree at Chicago on 1898, Davenport became a high school principal before returning to Chicago as a faculty member. He began his formal career as assistant professor at the University of Chicago in 1902. During his previous 41 years, he had attended Harvard Law School, the University of Leipzig, Ecole Libre des Sciences Politiques in Paris, the University of South Dakota, and the University of Chicago. He moved to the University of Missouri to become department head and first dean of the College of Business in 1908. In 1916, he transferred to Cornell, where he finished his academic career. He also made and lost a fortune in business, largely in land speculation.

The Herbert J. Davenport Society is the University of Missouri College of Business's alumni organization.

Work

General 
An admirer of Thorstein Veblen, Davenport carved a unique niche in the world of academic economics, avoiding the Institutionalist approach inspired by Veblen, and incorporating insights from the Austrian and Lausanne economists. For Davenport, the entrepreneur was central to market activity. He accepted the Austrian concept of opportunity cost (found in the work of Friedrich von Wieser) but rejected the neoclassical conception of marginal utility. He was a relentless critic of Alfred Marshall, his last book being a critique of The Economics of Alfred Marshall (1935). In that book, he criticized Marshall as a classical economist who subscribed to the real cost doctrine and his assumption of homogeneity of different costs.

Davenport, along with Frank A. Fetter, comprised, as Fetter put it, a distinct, if small, school of economics: the American Psychological School. Frank Knight, a student and admirer of Davenport's, did not succeed in imprinting many of Davenport's ideas onto the Chicago School neoclassical tradition.

Scholarly works 
Davenport wrote numerous articles which were published in such prestigious economic journals as the Journal of Political Economy, the Quarterly Journal of Economics and the American Economic Review.

He also wrote several major books. His first article, written while an undergraduate in South Dakota, was "The Formula of Sacrifice" (1894), an exploration of the concept of subjective opportunity cost. Viewed in retrospect, his "Outlines of Economic Theory" was a preliminary version of his 1908 Value and Distribution (1908). The latter was a full-fledged critical examination of the major economic doctrines of classical and early neoclassical thought. Among other things, it contained critiques of marginal utility, of the contemporary Austrian theories of capital and cost, and of Frank Fetter's theory of market interest.

While he had a penchant for criticizing the emerging neoclassical economics, most of his criticism was leveled at vestiges of classical economics, such as the doctrine of real cost and the tripartite division of factors of production, which had led some classical economists to advocate a tax on land value. Although one biographer and student saw him as a reformer (Homan), another lamented the absence of real reformist ideas and even of the awareness of the need to follow criticism with clear statements about what was right and how it could be achieved (Frank Knight). His relentless criticism is probably the main reason that his works have, in general, been neglected by historians of economic thought.

The extensive citations and treatment of economic others ideas in this book were omitted in his later book The Economics of Enterprise (1914). This book was a tightly-knit theory of price from the entrepreneur point of view (to be contrasted with the "social" point of view). In that book, he worked out an image of economic interaction in which all phenomena was interpreted through the eyes and minds of entrepreneurs. This theory was complemented by a theory of credit and money for the era of free enterprise in banking ("loan fund theory of capital").

Reception 
As a teacher, he was an artist. "He never lectured in any conservative way. He pitted his students against one another. He subjected them to grilling cross-examination capped by the decisive point and apt illustration, punctuated by satirical amusement toward the inept and the unprepared." Perhaps the best reflection on Davenport as a person comes from the fact that for many years, he used his savings to pay friends in South Dakota who had made real estate investments through him in the early 1890s.

Selected publications 
 Davenport, Herbert J., Outlines of Economic Theory, New York: Macmillan, 1896.
 Davenport, Herbert J., Outlines of Elementary Economic Theory, 1898.
 Davenport, Herbert J., Value and Distribution, Chicago: University of Chicago Press, 1908
 Davenport, Herbert J., Capitalization and market value, paper 1910.
 Davenport, Herbert J., Economics of Enterprise, New York: Macmillan, 1913
 Davenport, Herbert J., The Economics of Alfred Marshall. Ithaca, New York: Cornell University Press, 1935

Articles, a selection:
 Davenport, Herbert J. (1894) "The Formula of Sacrifice." Journal of Political Economy. 2 (September): 561–573
 Davenport, Herbert J., 1902, "Proposed Modifications in Austrian Theory and Terminology." Quarterly Journal of Economics, May
 Davenport, Herbert J., 1904, "Capital as a Competitive Concept," Journal of Political Economy, December
 Davenport, Herbert J., 1905, "Doctrinal Tendencies: Fetter, Flux, Seager and Carver," Yale Review, November
 Davenport, Herbert J., "Social Productivity Versus Private Acquisitions", Quarterly Journal of Economics, November, 1910

References

Further reading 
 Clark, John Bates, 1897, book review of H. J. Davenport's Outlines of Economic Theory, Journal of Political Economy, June
 Clark, J. Maurice, 1914, "Davenport's Economics," Political Science Quarterly, June
 Dorfman, Joseph, 1949, "Herbert Joseph Davenport: Conflict of Loyalties," in Joseph Dorfman, The Economic Mind in American Civilization, Volume 3, pages 375–390, New York, Viking
 Frank Knight (1931) "Davenport, Herbert Joseph". In Encyclopedia of the Social Sciences. Vol. 5 (8–9). New York: Macmillan
 Kendrick, M.S. (1931) "Davenport, Herbert Joseph." Dictionary of American Biographies: Vol 21. New York: Shribner.
 Gunning, J. Patrick. (1998) "Herbert J. Davenport's Transformation of the Austrian Theory of Value and Cost." In Malcolm Rutherford (ed.). The Economic Mind in America: Essays in the History of American Economics: London: Routledge
 Gunning, J. Patrick. (1998b) "H. J. Davenport's Loan Fund Theory of Capital." Journal of the History of Economic Thought. 20 (3): 349–369
 Gunning, J. Patrick. (2006) “Davenport's Work.” Preliminary version
 Homan, Paul T. (1931) "Herbert Joseph Davenport 1861–1931." American Economic Review. 21 (December): 696–700

External links 
 

1861 births
1931 deaths
Economists from Vermont
Austrian School economists
Harvard Law School alumni
Leipzig University alumni
University of Chicago alumni
University of Chicago faculty
University of Missouri faculty
University of South Dakota alumni
Presidents of the American Economic Association
Journal of Political Economy editors